is a railway station in Fukushima-ku, Osaka, Japan, operated by the West Japan Railway Company (JR West) and the private railway operator Hanshin Electric Railway.

Lines
Fukushima Station is served by the JR West Osaka Loop Line and the Hanshin Main Line.  It is close to Shin-Fukushima Station on the JR West JR Tōzai Line.

JR West

Platforms
The JR West station consists of an elevated island platform serving two tracks.

Adjacent stations

History 
Station numbering was introduced in March 2018 with Fukushima being assigned station number JR-O12.

Hanshin

Platforms
The station consists of two underground side platforms serving two tracks.

Adjacent stations

History
What is now the JR West station opened on 5 April 1898.

The Hanshin Electric Railway station opened on 12 April 1905.

Surrounding area
 Shin-Fukushima Station (JR Tōzai Line)
 Nakanoshima Station (Keihan Nakanoshima Line)
Hotel Hanshin
Hotarumachi
Asahi Broadcasting Corporation
ABC Hall
Dojima River Forum

References

External links

 Fukushima Station (JR West) 
 Fukushima Station (Hanshin) 

Fukushima-ku, Osaka
Railway stations in Japan opened in 1905
Railway stations in Japan opened in 1898
Railway stations in Osaka Prefecture
Railway stations in Osaka
Osaka Loop Line
Hanshin Main Line